Craigmyle is a hamlet in Alberta, Canada within Starland County. It is located between the towns of Delia and Hanna.  It was named in 1912 by a Canadian Northern Railway ahead of the train's arrival in April 1914. The name is said to be based on a Scottish estate. Previously incorporated as a village, Craigmyle dissolved to become a hamlet on 1 January 1972.

Climate

Demographics 

The population of Craigmyle according to the 2013 municipal census conducted by Starland County is 79.

See also 
List of communities in Alberta
List of former urban municipalities in Alberta
List of hamlets in Alberta

References 

Hamlets in Alberta
Former villages in Alberta
Starland County
Populated places disestablished in 1972